William Harmon House is a historic home located at Lima in Livingston County, New York. It was built about 1851 and is a -story Gothic Revival style board-and-batten cottage in a cruciform plan.  The exterior and interior features rich Gothic ornamentation.

It was listed on the National Register of Historic Places in 1989.

References

Houses on the National Register of Historic Places in New York (state)
Gothic Revival architecture in New York (state)
Houses completed in 1851
Houses in Livingston County, New York
1851 establishments in New York (state)
National Register of Historic Places in Livingston County, New York